This is a list of the civil parishes in the modern county of Fingal in Ireland. There are four baronies that are entirely contained in the county and one that is partly in the county and partly in the city of Dublin. Baronies and civil parishes continue to be officially defined units; they are no longer, however, used for many administrative purposes. Today, administrative authority for the county is vested in Fingal County Council. While they have been administratively obsolete since 1898, they continue to be used in land registration, and specification such as in planning permissions.

References
From the Placenames Database of Ireland

Other sources

 
Lists of civil parishes in Ireland